Sedalia is an unincorporated town, a post office, and a census-designated place (CDP) located in and governed by Douglas County, Colorado, United States. The CDP is a part of the Denver–Aurora–Lakewood, CO Metropolitan Statistical Area. The Sedalia post office has the ZIP Code 80135. At the United States Census 2010, the population of the Sedalia CDP was 206, while the population of the 80135 ZIP Code Tabulation Area was 3,833 including adjacent areas.

History
The Sedalia post office has been in operation since 1872. The community was named after Sedalia, Missouri.

Geography

Demographics

Education
The Douglas County School District serves Sedalia.

Notable people
Notable individuals who were born in or have lived in Sedalia include:
 Philip F. Roach (1881-1976), U.S. Coast Guard Commodore, Navy Cross recipient,
Renée Brinkerhoff, First Female driver to win La Carrera Panamericana in 2017 | |
Scott E. Crawford, U.S. Army Chief Warrant Officer Four, Bronze Star recipient for wartime action during Operation Desert Storm.

See also

Outline of Colorado
Index of Colorado-related articles
State of Colorado
Colorado cities and towns
Colorado census designated places
Colorado counties
Douglas County, Colorado
List of statistical areas in Colorado
Front Range Urban Corridor
North Central Colorado Urban Area
Denver-Aurora-Boulder, CO Combined Statistical Area
Denver-Aurora-Broomfield, CO Metropolitan Statistical Area
Union Pacific Railroad
Denver & Rio Grande Railroad

References

External links

Sedalia @ Colorado.com
Douglas County website
Douglas County School District

Census-designated places in Douglas County, Colorado
Census-designated places in Colorado
Denver metropolitan area